Petterd is a surname. Notable people with the surname include:

 Ricky Petterd (born 1988), Australian rules footballer
 William Frederick Petterd (1849–1910), Tasmanian scientist and boot importer

See also
 Petter (given name)